Oakville is a census-designated place (CDP) in south St. Louis County, Missouri, United States. The population was 36,143 at the 2010 census. Oakville is 18 miles south of the city of St. Louis and borders the Mississippi and Meramec rivers; the area is part of "South County" (south St. Louis County).

Geography
Oakville is located at  (38.458620, -90.319324).

Notable people

 Pat Maroon - National Hockey League player
 Todd Newton - Gameshow/Podcast Host/Media
 Bridgett Riley - boxer and kickboxer
 Steve Ralston - MLS and USNT soccer player

Demographics

2010 census
As of the census of 2010, there were 36,143 people, 13,788 households, and 10,511 families living in the CDP. The racial makeup of the CDP was 96.0% White, 0.8% African American, 0.1% Native American, 1.8% Asian, 0.3% from other races, and 1.0% from two or more races. Hispanic or Latino of any race were 1.4% of the population.

There were 13,788 households, of which 32.4% had children under the age of 18 living with them, 65.4% were married couples living together, 7.7% had a female householder with no husband present, 3.2% had a male householder with no wife present, and 23.8% were non-families. 19.9% of all households were made up of individuals, and 8% had someone living alone who was 65 years of age or older. The average household size was 2.61 and the average family size was 3.02.

The median age in the CDP was 43.7 years. 22.8% of residents were under the age of 18; 8% were between the ages of 18 and 24; 21.1% were from 25 to 44; 33.9% were from 45 to 64; and 14.3% were 65 years of age or older. The gender makeup of the CDP was 49.0% male and 51.0% female.

2000 census
As of the census of 2000, there were 35,309 people, 12,530 households, and 9,923 families living in the CDP. The racial makeup of the CDP was 98.19% White, 0.07% African American, 0.01% Native American, 0.92% Asian, 0.02% Pacific Islander, 0.20% from other races, and 0.60% from two or more races. Hispanic or Latino of any race were 1.03% of the population.

There were 12,530 households, out of which 39.1% had children under the age of 18 living with them, 69.6% were married couples living together, 7.0% had a female householder with no husband present, and 20.8% were non-families. 17.3% of all households were made up of individuals, and 5.8% had someone living alone who was 65 years of age or older.  The average household size was 2.81 and the average family size was 3.20.

In the CDP, the population was spread out, with 27.0% under the age of 18, 8.9% from 18 to 24, 26.8% from 25 to 44, 27.6% from 45 to 64, and 9.6% who were 65 years of age or older.  The median age was 38 years. For every 100 females, there were 97.2 males.  For every 100 females age 18 and over, there were 94.0 males.

The median income for a household in the CDP was $68,248, and the median income for a family was $76,223 (these figures had risen to $73,027 and $87,568 respectively as of a 2007 estimate). Males had a median income of $52,123 versus $33,604 for females.  The per capita income for the CDP was $26,750.  About 2.0% of families and 2.8% of the population were below the poverty line, including 3.3% of those under age 18 and 4.0% of those age 65 or over.

Education

Schools
Oakville belongs entirely to the Mehlville School District (R-9) and the St. Louis County Special School District. Oakville High School and Mehlville High School are the two high schools in the Mehlville School District, but only Oakville High School is located in the Oakville area. Oakville Middle School is also located within the Mehlville School district. There are three Catholic grade schools in Oakville: St. Francis of Assisi, Queen of All Saints, and St. Margaret Mary Alacoque.

Community colleges
St. Louis Community College's South County Education and University Center is located off Meramec Bottom Road at Lemay Ferry Road.

Public libraries
The St. Louis County Library Cliff Cave Branch is in Oakville CDP.

References

Census-designated places in St. Louis County, Missouri
Missouri populated places on the Mississippi River
Census-designated places in Missouri